The Society for the Promotion of Hospice Care is a non-profit NGO that advocates and provides hospice and palliative care services in Hong Kong. It also conducts end-of-life research, education, and training.

The organisation’s subsidiaries – Jockey Club Home for Hospice and Jesse and Thomas Tam Centre – provide palliative patient care and bereavement support respectively. The current Chairman is Dr Hubert Chan.

History

Establishment 
The need for end-of-life care in Hong Kong was identified in 1984, when Sister Gabriel O’Mahoney, then medical superintendent of Ruttonjee Sanatorium, invited Professor James Hanrathy of St Joseph's Hospice  in the United Kingdom to a local hospice care conference sponsored by the Keswick Foundation. In 1986, SPHC was established by Sister Gabriel O’Mahoney, Dr Vincent Tse, Dr Yu Wing Kwong, Reverend Ralph Lee and Reverend John Russell to advocate hospice care in Hong Kong.

SPHC originally operated from a 70-square-foot workstation in the old Ruttonjee Sanatorium where a small team of doctors, nurses, social workers, and pastoral care workers - many of whom were part-time staff - ran a hospice care outpatient clinic.

Bradbury Hospice 
In 1992, SPHC opened Bradbury Hospice, Hong Kong’s first independent hospice, in Shatin. For the first three years of operation, the 26-bed facility was funded entirely through public contributions. In 1995, SPHC transferred the management and control of Bradbury Hospice to the Hospital Authority, signifying the incorporation of hospice care into Hong Kong’s public health system.

Jessie and Thomas Tam Centre 
In 1997, SPHC opened the Jessie and Thomas Tam Centre, the first community-based centre for bereavement support in Hong Kong. The centre provides services to the public free-of-charge with the support of charitable donations.

Jockey Club Home for Hospice 
In 2012, SPHC commenced the construction of Jockey Club Home for Hospice following a grant of land by the Hong Kong SAR Government and funding by the Hong Kong Jockey Club Charities Trust. The 30-bed hospice opened in September 2017 and is located in Shatin, directly opposite Bradbury Hospice. The SPHC headquarters relocated to JCHH upon its completion.

Jockey Club Home for Hospice 
Jockey Club Home for Hospice is an independent 30-bed hospice that provides 24-hour comprehensive, patient-centred palliative care for patients with life-limiting illnesses and their significant others. It adopts a family-oriented approach that emphasizes the involvement of family members in patient care. Active family participation will likely act as a future buffer against complicated grief and improve the quality of death.

JCHH is staffed with a multidisciplinary team of palliative doctors, nurses, personal care workers, allied health professionals, and social workers. Financial assistance is available to eligible underprivileged patients. Aside from patient care, the hospice is also used for professional training and educational programmes.

Facilities 

 30 private ensuite rooms
 Garden
 Quiet Room
 Farewell Room
 Mortuary
 Pharmacy
 Play room
 Lecture theatre

Services 

 In-patient care
 Home care
 Day care
 Bereavement support
 Physiotherapy
 Occupational therapy
 Clinical psychology
 Social work
 Aromatherapy
 Massage therapy
 Hypnotherapy
 Carer training

Education and Training 
SPHC uses education and training to promote and raise the standard of palliative care in Hong Kong. Since 2004, SPHC has organized the annual Hong Kong Palliative Care Symposium.  In 2009, the 3G Quality Retirement Programme was initiated to promote healthy and productive aging among retirees. As of 2019, 22 3G courses have been completed. SPHC is the first palliative care training provider in Hong Kong and regularly offers classes on end-of-life care, bereavement support, and advanced care planning to both local and visiting participants.

Funding 
SPHC is a self-financed organisation and does not receive government subventions or annual grants to support its administrative and operating expenses. JCHH is funded entirely through service income, and voluntary contributions from individuals, companies and charitable foundations.  Three signature fundraising events are held annually to help subsidize palliative care for the underprivileged.

Hike for Hospice 
Hike for Hospice is an annual fundraising event first held in 1992. Hikers may participate under one of four categories – Individual, Team, Corporate Challenge, and Alumni Challenge. A longstanding tradition is the serving of Indian-style curry after the hike. The current Organizing Committee Chairman is Edward Naylor.

Light Up a Life Concert 
Light Up a Life Concert is a fundraising event held annually at St. John’s Cathedral. The concert debuted in 1990 and has featured festive music by the Hong Kong Welsh Male Voice Choir and the Island School Orchestra and Choir. Guests may also take part in a tree lighting ceremony in remembrance of the departed. The current Organizing Committee Chairman is Mr. Andrew Williamson.

Senior E-Sports and Experience Day 
Senior E-Sports and Experience Day is an annual fundraising event organized in partnership with the Federation of Hong Kong Industries and the Hong Kong Cyberport Management Company Limited. The event was first held in 2018 and aims to promote happy and healthy aging through technology, specifically in the form of a football e-tournament for elderly participants.

Governance 
The Executive Committee is the highest governing body of SPHC, consisting of 20 members and 4 co-opted members as of July 2019. New members are selected at the Annual General Meeting held in December each year. The current Chairman is Dr. Hubert Chan, who has held the position since 2017.

References

External links 
 Official website
 YouTube channel

Non-profit organisations based in Hong Kong
Hospice
Healthcare in Hong Kong